Perpendicular bisector construction can refer to:

 Bisection#Line segment bisector, on the construction of the perpendicular bisector of a line segment
 Perpendicular bisector construction of a quadrilateral, on the use of perpendicular bisectors of a quadrilateral's sides to form another quadrilateral